The 1940 Princeton Tigers football team was an American football team that represented Princeton University as an independent during the 1940 college football season. In its third season under head coach Tad Wieman, the team compiled a 5–2–1 record and outscored opponents by a total of 119 to 112. Princeton played its 1940 home games at Palmer Stadium in Princeton, New Jersey.

Howie Stanley was Princeton's team captain. He also received the John Prentiss Poe Cup, the team's highest award. Halfback Dave Allerdice was selected by the Associated Press as a second-team player on the 1940 All-Eastern college football team, and by the Central Press Association as a third-team player on the All-America team.

Schedule

Roster
 Donald B. Allen, Class of 1943
 David W. Allerdice, Class of 1941
 Baker A. Bradenbaugh, Class of 1941
 Paul Busse, Class of 1942
 Howard M. Clark, Class of 1942
 Dave K. Headley, Class of 1943
 James J. Howley, Class of 1942
 Thomas B. Irwin, Class of 1942
 Robert K. Jackson, Class of 1941
 Gregory T. Kinniry, Class of 1944
 James R. MacColl III, Class of 1941
 Charles R. McAllister, Class of 1942
 William L. Morris Jr., Class of 1943
 Lawrence P. Naylor III, Class of 1941
 Robert I. Perina, Class of 1943
 Robert L. Peters Jr., Class of 1942
 William D. Pettit, Class of 1941
 C. Leslie Rice Jr., Class of 1941
 Charles L. Ransom, Class of 1942
 Charles H. Robinson, Class of 1941
 Edward C. Rose Jr., Class of 1942
 Robert P. Sandbach, Class of 1943
 Richard R. Schmon, Class of 1943
 William S. Shee, Class of 1941
 Howard J. Stanley, Class of 1941
 William F. Stebbins, Class of 1941
 H. James Stokes Jr., Class of 1941
 Robert M. Thomas, Class of 1942
 Bruce P. Wilson, Class of 1942
 S.A. Young Jr., Class of 1941

References

Princeton
Princeton Tigers football seasons
Princeton Tigers football